Taşucu Seka Harbor is a harbor in Turkey. Taşucu is a town in Silifke ilçe (district) of Mersin Province. It is situated to the west of the Göksu River, and is the main port of the settlements in the Göksu River valley. Taşucu is the name of the belde (town) and Seka is the name of the paper mill situated next to Taşucu.

The harbor
In the province, Taşucu Seka Harbor is the second biggest harbor after Mersin Harbor.
The harbor is composed of two sections. The smaller section in the west was constructed as the harbor of the town and the bigger section in the east was the harbor of the Seka paper mill which is currently out of service.

References

Buildings and structures in Mersin Province
Silifke District
Ports and harbours of Turkey
Ports and harbours of the Mediterranean